Isidore (also spelled Isador, Isadore and Isidor) is an English and French masculine given name. The name is derived from the Greek name Isídōros (Ἰσίδωρος) and can literally be translated to "gift of Isis." The name has survived in various forms throughout the centuries. Although it has never been a common name, it has historically been popular due to its association with Catholic figures and among the Jewish diaspora. Isidora is the feminine form of the name.

Pre-modern era
Ordered chronologically

Religious figures
 
 Isidore of Alexandria (died 403), Egyptian priest, saint
 Isidore of Chios (died 251), Roman Christian martyr
 Isidore of Scété (died c. 390), 4th-century A.D. Egyptian Christian priest and desert ascetic
 Isidore of Pelusium (died c. 449), Egyptian monk, saint and prolific letter writer
 Isidore of Seville (c. 560–636), Catholic saint and scholar, last of the Fathers of the Church and Archbishop of Seville 
 Isidore the Laborer (c. 1070–1130), Spanish religious leader
 Isidore I of Constantinople (died 1350), Greek Ecumenical Patriarch (1347–1350)
 Isidore II of Constantinople (died 1462), Greek Ecumenical Patriarch (1456–1462)
 Isidore of Kiev (1385–1463), Greek religious leader and theologian

Others
 Isidore of Charax (fl. 1st century), Greek geographer
 Isidore of Alexandria (died c. 520), Greco-Egyptian philosopher
 Isidore of Miletus, Greek architect who co-designed the Hagia Sophia in Constantinople from 532 to 537
 Isidore (inventor), according to legend the Russian Orthodox monk erroneously credited with producing the first genuine recipe of Russian vodka, c. 1430

Modern world
Ordered alphabetically by last name
 Isidore Gordon Ascher (1835–1933),  British-Canadian novelist and poet
 Isidor Bajic (1878–1915), Serbian composer, pedagogue and publisher
 Isidore Bakanja (c. 1885–1909), beatified martyr in the Belgium Congo
 Isadore Coop (1926-2003), Canadian architect
 Isador Coriat (1875–1943), American psychiatrist and neurologist
 Ivor Cutler (born Isadore; 1923–2006), Scottish poet, songwriter and humorist
 Isidore Ducasse (1846-1870), French poet best known under the nom de plume of Comte de Lautréamont
 Isidor Izzy Einstein (1880–1938), American federal police officer during the Prohibition era
 Isidor Fisch (1905–1934), German associate of Bruno Hauptmann
 Isadore Friz Freleng (1906–1995), American cartoonist
 Isador Goodman (1909–1982), South African-Australian musician and composer
 Isidor Gunsberg (1854–1930), Hungarian chess player
 Isidore Itzkowitz (1892–1964), better known as Eddie Cantor, American performer and comedian
 Isidor Kaufmann (1853–1921), Austro-Hungarian painter of Jewish themes
 Izidor Kürschner (1885–1941), Hungarian football player and coach
 Isidore Newman (fl. 1903), founder of the Isidore Newman School
 Isidor Philipp (1863–1958), Hungarian-French pianist, composer and pedagogue
 Isidor Isaac Rabi (1898–1988), Galician-born American physicist and Nobel laureate 
 Isidor Rosenthal (1836–1915), German physiologist
 Isadore Singer (1924-2021), American mathematician
 Isador Sobel (1858–1939), American lawyer
 Isidore Spielmann (1854–1925), British art critic and exhibition organizer
 I. F. Stone (1907–1989), American investigative journalist
 Isidor Straus (1845–1912), co-owner of Macy's, drowned in the sinking of RMS Titanic
 Isador Samuel Turover (1892–1978), Belgian-American chess master
 Chief Isadore (fl. 1860s), leader of the Ktunaxa/Kootenay people in the Tobacco Plains War

Theophoric names
English masculine given names
French masculine given names